The Ferozepore Brigade was an infantry brigade of the British Indian Army that formed part of the Indian Army during the First World War.  It was formed in December 1914 as part of the 3rd Lahore Divisional Area for service on the North West Frontier and renamed as 44th (Ferozepore) Brigade in August 1915.  It remained in India throughout the First World War but saw active service in the Third Anglo-Afghan War with the 16th Indian Division.

Post-war, the brigade underwent a number of changes in designation before settling on Ferozepore Brigade Area by the outbreak of the Second World War.  It was broken up in February 1942.

History
At the outbreak of the First World War, the Ferozepore Brigade was part of the 3rd (Lahore) Division.  It was mobilized in August 1914 with the division as the 7th (Ferozepore) Brigade and sailed from Bombay and Karachi between 24 and 29 September for the Western Front.  The 3rd Lahore Divisional Area was formed in September 1914 to take over the area responsibilities of the 3rd (Lahore) Division and in December 1914 a new Ferozepore Brigade was formed in 3rd Lahore Divisional Area to replace the original brigade.  In August 1915 it was designated as 44th (Ferozepore) Brigade.

From March 1916, it was intended to form a reserve division for the North West Frontier, but the urgent need to find troops for Mesopotamia meant that the 16th Indian Division was not formed until December 1916.  In February 1917 the brigade was transferred to the new division.  The brigade remained on the North West Frontier throughout the First World War but was mobilized with 16th Indian Division to take part in the Third Anglo-Afghan War.

In September 1920, the brigade was redesignated as 12th Indian Infantry Brigade and as 16th Indian Infantry Brigade from October 1921not to be confused with an identically designated but unrelated 12th and 16th Indian Infantry Brigades of the Second World War.  In 1923, the brigade was once again renamed Ferozepore Brigade.  By the outbreak of the Second World War it was designated as Ferozepore Brigade Area and it was broken up in February 1942.

Orders of battle

Commanders
The 44th (Ferozepore) Brigade / 12th Indian Infantry Brigade / 16th Indian Infantry Brigade / Ferozepore Brigade Area had the following commanders:

See also

 7th (Ferozepore) Brigade of the First World War
 44th Indian Infantry Brigade of the Second World War

Notes

References

Bibliography

External links
 

Brigades of India in World War I
Military units and formations established in 1914
Military units and formations disestablished in 1942